The Town of Babylon is one of ten towns in Suffolk County, New York, United States. Its population was 218,223 as of the 2020 census. Parts of Jones Beach Island, Captree Island and Fire Island are in the southernmost part of the town. It borders Nassau County to the west and the Atlantic Ocean to the south. The village of Babylon is also within the town.

History
The region was once called Huntington South. Nathaniel Conklin moved his family to the area, and around 1803 named it New Babylon, after the ancient city of Babylon.

The town was officially formed in 1872 by a partition of the Town of Huntington.

Communities and locations
The following communities and locations are within the Town of Babylon:

Villages
Amityville, in the southwestern part of the town.
Babylon, in the southeastern section of the town.
Lindenhurst, in the southern part of the town, between the villages of Babylon and Amityville.

Hamlets
 Captree or Captree Island
 Copiague
 Deer Park
 East Farmingdale
 Gilgo, includes communities of West Gilgo Beach, Gilgo Beach,  and Cedar Beach
 North Amityville
 North Babylon
 North Lindenhurst
 Oak Beach, includes community of Oak Island
 West Babylon
 Wheatley Heights
 Wyandanch

Other communities
 Amity Harbor, in the hamlet of Amityville
 Copiague Harbor, in the hamlet of Copiague

Islands
Captree Island, an island partly in the southeastern part of the town and containing part of Captree State Park.
Cedar Island, an island in the Great South Bay.
Gilgo Island, an island in the western end of the Great South Bay.
Grass Island, an island in the Great South Bay.
Thatch Island, an island in the Great South Bay.
Oak Island, an island in the Great South Bay.

Beaches
 Cedar Beach
 Gilgo Beach
 Oak Beach
 Overlook Beach

State parks
 Belmont Lake State Park, a state park in the northeastern part of the town.
 Captree State Park, a state park partly in the southeastern section of the town and adjacent to the Fire Island Inlet.
 Gilgo State Park, an undeveloped preserve on a barrier island on the southern side of the town.
 Robert Moses State Park, a state park on Fire Island, is partly in the town.

Other
 Fire Island Inlet, a passage between the Atlantic Ocean and the Great South Bay.
 The town was featured in the American version of Gordon Ramsay's Kitchen Nightmares. Ramsay spent a week at Peter's, an Italian eatery that's now out of business.
Tanner Park, Town of Babylon, Copaigue, New York

Media
WBAB 102.3FM is licensed to Babylon with studios at 555 Sunrise Highway.

The Babylon Beacon has covered the town for many years.

Geography
The western town line is the border of Nassau County, and the southern town boundary is the Atlantic Ocean.

According to the United States Census Bureau, the town has a total area of 114.2 square miles (295.7 km2), of which 52.3 square miles (135.4 km2) is land and 61.9 square miles (160.2 km2) is water. The total area is 54.20% water.

Government 
Babylon is governed by supervisor Rich Schaffer and four town council members.

Transportation

Airports
Republic Airport is an airport in East Farmingdale originally built by Fairchild Aircraft in 1927, and acquired by Republic Aviation in 1939. Currently, it also houses the American Airpower Museum. Zahn's Airport also existed in North Amityville from 1936 to 1980. Long Island Macarthur Airport is a nearby commercial city-owned airport in Ronkonkoma, with daily commercial flights.

Railroad lines
The Long Island Rail Road's Babylon Branch is the primary railroad line in the town running from the Nassau County Line and terminating in the Village of Babylon with stations from Amityville to Babylon. Rail freight service also exists along the Central Branch which also uses some Montauk Branch trains running from the Main Line in Bethpage. East of Babylon station, the Montauk Branch continues across the Babylon-Islip Town Line. Additionally, the Main Line runs through the northern part of the town with stations in Pinelawn, Wyandanch and Deer Park.

Bus service
The Town of Babylon is served primarily by Suffolk County Transit bus routes.

Major roads

 Southern State Parkway
 Robert Moses Causeway
 Ocean Parkway
  New York State Route 24
 New York State Route 27
 New York State Route 27A
  New York State Route 109
  New York State Route 110
  New York State Route 231

Demographics

As of the census of 2000, there were 211,792 people, 69,048 households, and 52,407 families residing in the town. The population density was 4,050.0 people per square mile (1,563.8/km2). There were 71,186 housing units at an average density of 1,361.3 per square mile (525.6/km2). The racial makeup of the town was 76.34% White, 15.65% Black or African American, 0.27% Native American, 1.89% Asian, 0.03% Pacific Islander, 3.36% from other races, and 2.47% from two or more races.  10.05% of the population were Hispanic or Latino of any race.

There were 69,048 households, out of which 35.7% had children under the age of 18 living with them, 57.6% were married couples living together, 13.7% had a female householder with no husband present, and 24.1% were non-families. 19.1% of all households were made up of individuals, and 8.5% had someone living alone who was 65 years of age or older. The average household size was 3.03 and the average family size was 3.45.

In the town, the population was spread out, with 26.0% under the age of 18, 7.5% from 18 to 24, 32.4% from 25 to 44, 21.6% from 45 to 64, and 12.4% who were 65 years of age or older. The median age was 36 years. For every 100 females, there were 93.0 males. For every 100 females age 18 and over, there were 89.3 males.

The median income for a household in the town was $60,064, and the median income for a family was $66,261. Males had a median income of $45,160 versus $32,062 for females. The per capita income for the town was $22,844. 6.7% of the population and 4.6% of families were below the poverty line. Out of the total population, 7.4% of those under the age of 18 and 7.4% of those 65 and older were living below the poverty line.

Notable people 
 Steve Bellone, Suffolk County Executive
 Tom Bohrer, Olympic rower
 Rodney Dangerfield, comedian
 Dan Meuser, US Representative for Pennsylvania's 9th congressional district
 Rakim, rapper

See also

National Register of Historic Places listings in Babylon (town), New York

References

External links
 
 
 
 Babylon Beacon (local newspaper)

 
Towns on Long Island
Towns in Suffolk County, New York
Towns in the New York metropolitan area
Populated coastal places in New York (state)
Populated places established in 1872
1872 establishments in New York (state)